Alfred Fischer (14 December 1919 – 17 June 2004) was a German judge.  He served on the Federal Administrative Court from 1966 until 1987.

Most recently he was chairman of the 2nd Senate (officials and staff representation rights). He was a commentator for staff representation rights. In the early 1990s he worked as a trust officer in the Treuhandanstalt.

References

1919 births
2004 deaths
Place of birth missing
20th-century German judges
21st-century German judges